Steyning Grammar School is a coeducational day and boarding, senior school and sixth form, located in Steyning, West Sussex, England.

The school has two lower school sites catering for Years 7 and 8. The original site was located in Church Street, Steyning, which move to The Towers in Upper Beading in August 2022. A second site opened at Rock Road in Storrington in September 2017 (Former site of Rydon Community College). A larger upper school site at Shooting Field, Steyning caters for students in Years 9 to 11 who study the Key Stage 4 curriculum over three years. The school's Sixth Form College for students in Years 12 and 13 is also based at the Shooting Field site.

History

Steyning Grammar School was founded and endowed as a grammar school in 1614 by William Holland, an Alderman of Chichester. In 1968, it merged with Steyning Secondary Modern School to form the current comprehensive school. The combined school shares two sites in Steyning. The original half-timbered Church Street site housed years 7 and 8 until the end of the 2021-22 academic year after which this age group ('Lower School') transferred to the Towers site in nearby Upper Beeding. The main Shooting Field site houses years 9-11 and the sixth form college. A third lower school site opened in Storrington in September 2017 following the closure of Rydon Community College. Some Physical education lessons are taught at Steyning Leisure Centre.

On 11 March 2020, after only two one-hour meetings open to the community, school governors voted to convert the 400-year-old school to an academy as part of the Bohunt Trust. A teaching union warned that the school has “nothing to gain and everything to lose” and there was talk of strike action after the plans were announced. Converting Steyning Grammar School into an academy "would give Bohunt complete control over its curriculum and the hiring of teachers".

Bohunt Education Trust runs eight schools in total, including secondary schools in Worthing and Horsham.

In December 2021 a viral report of a "bleak" Christmas dinner composed of "a mince pie, dry bread roll, slice of turkey, single pig in blanket, and a tiny square of stuffing" went viral, reports indicating the school apologised and the £3.50 cost of the meal was refunded.

Notable alumni

Greg Barker, Conservative MP for Bexhill and Battle
Sir Tom Blundell, head of biochemistry at the University of Cambridge
Bernard Holden MBE, President of the Bluebell Railway and pioneer in railway preservation
Adam Stephen Kelly, award-winning film writer, director and producer
Ralph Lainson OBE, parasitologist
Peter Marshall, author and anarchist
Geoffrey Munn OBE, MVO. Historian; retired managing director of London jewellers, Wartski, BBC Antiques Roadshow jewellery expert
Elizabeth Norton, historian
John Pell, 1611–85, originator of Pell's equation
Jessica Rosemary Shepherd, botanical artist and botanist
Connor Swindells, actor
Maisie Peters, singer
John Trevett (1942–2019), cricketer
Ted Walker, 1934–2004, poet, author and dramatist
Lancelot Ware OBE, 1915–2000, co-founder of Mensa

Boarding
Steyning Grammar School has a boarding site located at Church Street. It is opposite the Lower School and is around half a mile away from the Upper School in Shooting Field. It is one of the only public state schools with boarding facilities.

Boarders can join at the beginning of Year 9 and Year 12 to follow GCSE and A-level courses respectively.

References

Further reading

External links
Official Steyning Grammar School website
Steyning Grammar School Old Boys website

Steyning
Boarding schools in West Sussex
Educational institutions established in the 1610s
1614 establishments in England
Secondary schools in West Sussex
Church of England secondary schools in the Diocese of Chichester
Academies in West Sussex